The Landwind Rongyao (荣曜) is a compact CUV produced by Chinese car manufacturer Landwind.

Overview

Codnamed E315 during development phase, the Landwind Rongyao debuted during the 2019 Shanghai Auto Show. 

The Landwind Rongyao is equipped with a 1.5 liter turbo inline-4 engine mated to either a 6-speed manual transmission or a 7-speed dual-clutch transmission. 

Designed by Giorgetto and Fabrizio Giugiaro (GFG Style), the Landwind Rongyao compact CUV was positioned above the Landwind Xiaoyao compact CUV and replacing the Landwind X7 compact CUV (a bootleg of the Range Rover Evoque).

References

External links
Official website 

Landwind vehicles
Crossover sport utility vehicles
Compact sport utility vehicles
Cars of China
Cars introduced in 2019